The Face in the Mirror (Finnish: Kasvot kuvastimessa) is a 1953 Finnish drama film directed by Ralf Rubin and starring Airi Honkaniemi, Tauno Majuri and Ritva Karisto. The film's style has some similarities to Italian neorealism.

Cast
 Airi Honkaniemi as Inkeri Harju  
 Tauno Majuri as The Doctor  
 Ritva Karisto as Tyttö tyttökodissa  
 Kalevi Hartti as Veikko Syvärinen  
 Jalmari Parikka as Romukauppias  
 Aili Valli as Neiti Kaarela  
 Erkki Holm 
 Uolevi Lönnberg as Kaarlo Virtanen 
 Ilmari Louko 
 Maria Braithwaite as Inkerin äiti  
 Erkki Ertama as Vittorio  
 Hellevi Selvilä as Maria Laine  
 Valentina Hietala as Opettaja  
 Sirkka Breider as Koulun opettaja  
 Aje Klinthe as Tyttökodin johtaja  
 Veikko Laihanen as Kuppilan pitäjä  
 Mirja Karisto as Ulla Rainto  
 Leila Lehtonen as Tyttö tyttökodissa
 Ossi Skurnik as Mies ravintolassa

References

Bibliography 
 Alfred Krautz. International directory of cinematographers set- and costume designers in film. Volume V. Saur, 1986.

External links 
 

1953 films
1953 drama films
Finnish drama films
1950s Finnish-language films
Finnish black-and-white films